Andrew Fletcher (birth unknown) is a former professional rugby league footballer who played in the 1970s, 1980s and 1990s.

Playing career

County honours
Andy Fletcher won cap(s) for Yorkshire while at Wakefield Trinity.

Challenge Cup Final appearances
Andy Fletcher played , i.e. number 5, in Wakefield Trinity's 3-12 defeat by Widnes in the 1979 Challenge Cup Final during the 1978–79 season at Wembley Stadium, London on Saturday 5 May 1979, in front of a crowd of a crowd of 94,218.

Club career
During his time at Wakefield Trinity he scored seventy 3-point tries and, eighteen 4-point tries.

References

Living people
Barrow Raiders players
Mansfield Marksman players
Place of birth missing (living people)
Wakefield Trinity players
Year of birth missing (living people)
Yorkshire rugby league team players
Rugby league wingers
English rugby league players